BASU may refer to:
 Basu
 Bihar Animal Sciences University, India
 British Association Of Softball Umpires
 Bu-Ali Sina University, Iran